Salarias ceramensis, the Seram blenny or Ceram blenny, is a species of combtooth blenny found in the western central Pacific ocean. This species reaches a length of  TL.

Salarias ceramensis is a shallow-water species (depth range 1–30 m) found in sheltered bays and lagoons, often among mixed algae and coral rubble, in silty habitats. It is present in aquarium trade and subject to minor commercial fisheries.

References

External links
 

ceramensis
Fish of the Pacific Ocean
Taxa named by Pieter Bleeker
Fish described in 1852